Mali competed at the 2010 Summer Youth Olympics, the inaugural Youth Olympic Games, held in Singapore from 14 August to 26 August 2010.

Athletics

Boys
Track and Road Events

Girls
Track and Road Events

Basketball

Girls

Taekwondo

References

External links
Competitors List: Mali

2010 in Malian sport
Nations at the 2010 Summer Youth Olympics
Mali at the Youth Olympics